is a Japanese actor. He is currently under contract with Amuse, Inc.

Filmography

TV series

Films

References

External links
  

21st-century Japanese male actors
1990 births
Living people
People from Amagasaki
Actors from Hyōgo Prefecture
Amuse Inc. talents
21st-century Japanese singers
21st-century Japanese male singers